Gaius Scribonius Curio ( – 49 BC) was the son of Gaius Scribonius Curio, consul in 76 BC and censor in 61 BC. His political allegiances changed over the course of the 50s BC until his tribunate, when he sided with Julius Caesar after possibly receiving a massive bribe. During the civil war, he sided with Caesar and led Caesarian troops to Sicily and then to Africa, where he was killed in battle.

Biography

Early life
Curio was the son of his homonymous father and his wife Memmia, born around 84 BC.

Curio and Mark Antony had a close friendship, which was denounced by their political enemies as immoral or possibly an affair. According to Cicero, after saving Antony from prostituting himself and paying his debts, the two youths had been banned from seeing each other by Curio's father. But, Curio smuggled Mark Antony in through his father's roof. Although this charge was in a defamatory speech against Marc Antony, and shouldn't be taken as entirely truthful.

Opponent of Caesar 
His first recorded political activity was, with his father, to support Publius Clodius Pulcher in the senate and the courts during the Bona Dea affair. Clodius had been accused of sacrilege; Curio's father vigorously opposed a senatorial resolution establishing a court for prosecution and the younger Curio fought the law that was correspondingly proposed in the assemblies.

He and his father became opponents of Caesar and the First Triumvirate in 59 BC. For their efforts, they were applauded in public and at the games. He was implicated in the Vettius affair – allegations, possibly masterminded by Caesar, that Curio was part of a conspiracy to assassinate Pompey – but the allegations were unbelieved and Vettius was found dead shortly thereafter.

A few years later, in 54 BC, he served as quaestor in Asia and stayed there for a few years. Around this time, his father died (he received a letter of condolence from Cicero). Upon his return to Rome in 52, he gave magnificent funeral games commemorating his father in collaboration Marcus Favonius, an ally of Cato who was then serving as aedile. He also married the widow of his friend Clodius, Fulvia, who had been killed in a street battle with Titus Annius Milo that January. This helped his public image among Clodius supporters and gave him the support of Clodius' gangs. His and Fulvia's son Scribonius Curio was born soon after.

Plebeian tribunate 
In the year 51, he prepared to stand for the aedileship the following year. But after the conviction of one of the plebeian tribunes-elect in July, he took the opportunity to stand as that tribune's replacement. The same year, he was elected to the pontificate. His political position had been firmly anti-Caesarian and he was expected to support Caesar's removal from Gaul without honours, block a possible second consulship, and repeal Caesar's agrarian legislation in 59. However, Curio changed his views, possibly because he resented the senate's refusal to insert an intercalary month or, after receiving a massive bribe from Caesar. However, it did not become clear that he had become an ally of Caesar for some months; Curio continued his anti-Caesarian proposals until his tribunician proposals – including for annexation of Mauritania – were rejected by the senate.

Only in March, when the question of Caesar's command was mooted before the senate, did Curio's position become more clear when he demanded that if Caesar were to be removed in Gaul, Pompey must also be removed in Spain. Through the year, Curio vetoed any other discussion of Caesar's command. The proposal was widely praised by the general population as an acceptable compromise that would avoid civil war, giving Curio tremendous popularity, but at the same time winning Curio the enmity of Pompey. The proposal also won the approval of many senators, who viewed it as "more attractive... than the rhetoric of inflexible confrontation".

In December 50, one of the then-censors, Appius Claudius Pulcher, attempted to have him removed from the senate, a proposal which the senate rejected at Curio's urging. At a following debate on Curio's motion that both Caesar and Pompey should step down, the senate voted hugely in favour (370 to 22). This motion, however, was vetoed by the consul, who then extrajudicially called upon Pompey to raise men to fight Caesar. Upon the expiration of his tribunate on 9 December 50 (tribunes took office on 10 December rather than 1 January), he complained to the people about Pompey and consul Marcellus and promptly fled to Caesar in Ravenna. 

As the year drew to a close, relations between Caesar and Pompey drew to a breaking point: a last-minute proposal brought by Curio and two of the tribunes for that year (Mark Antony and Quintus Cassius Longinus) on 1 January 49 BC was rejected and the senate – at the urging of the hardliners – voted to remove Caesar from his command (Curio and Marcus Caelius Rufus were the only dissenting votes) and moved the senatus consultum ultimum against Caesar. In response, Curio, Antony, Cassius, and Caelius fled the city to Caesar, and he then took up arms against the senate.

Civil war 
Around 10 January, the civil war started when Caesar crossed the Rubicon and invaded Italy proper. The cities and communities of northern Italy quickly fell or surrendered to Caesar and he ordered the recruitment of additional soldiers. Curio was put in charge of the recruiting operation. When Caesar reached Corfinium, Curio brought twenty-two cohorts of recruits to assist in the siege.

After Pompey's flight to Greece with about a third of the senate, Curio was put in command of three legions to take Sicily and Africa. Arriving in Sicily on 24 April 49 BC, he forced Cato from the province without bloodshed. Curio's success in Sicily also secured its grain supply and strategic position, allowing Caesar to feed the city and gain control of the central Mediterranean.

In August 49, he set sail from Lilybaeum and landed near Anquillaria on Cape Bon in Africa. There, he faced Attius Varus and King Juba I of Numidia, who had sided with Pompey. Although he won the Battle of Utica, he was forced to withdraw and eventually defeated by Saburra, Juba's general, at the Second Battle of the Bagradas River where he fought to the death, along with his army, rather than attempting to flee to his camp.

Marriages

By his marriage to Fulvia, the widow of Publius Clodius and a granddaughter of Gaius Gracchus, he got a step-daughter, Claudia; a step-son, Publius Clodius Pulcher; and an eponymous son.

His eponymous son was later executed by Octavian after the Battle of Actium for having supported Mark Antony.

Legacy
Curio built Rome's first permanent amphitheatre, in his father's memory and celebrated funeral games there with seating built on a pivot that could move the entire audience.

References

Citations

Sources

External links 
 

49 BC deaths
1st-century BC Romans
Ancient Roman generals
Ancient Roman rhetoricians
Husbands of Fulvia
Military personnel killed in action
Curio, Gaius
Senators of the Roman Republic
Tribunes of the plebs